Eremiaphila typhon is a species of praying mantis, native to Africa and Asia.

It is one of the most far-ranging species within its genus and has been found in Egypt, Algeria, Saudi Arabia, India, Libya, Niger, Syria, and Chad.

See also
List of mantis genera and species

References

T
Mantodea of Africa
Mantodea of Asia
Insects of Egypt
Insects of India
Insects of North Africa
Insects of West Africa
Insects of the Middle East
Insects of Chad
Insects described in 1835